The MONET cable system is a subsea fibre optic telecommunications cable completed in December 2017.  Final splicing occurred in November 2016.  Monet connects the cities of Praia Grande and Fortaleza in Brazil with Boca Raton in the United States.

TE SubCom was the selected provider for the project.

The cable is operated by four telecommunications companies: Algar Telecom, Angola Cables, ANTEL, and Google.

Equinix was selected by the Monet Submarine Cable investors to provide U.S. facilities and services for the cable landing station, terminating in the U.S. at Equinix's MI3 International Business Exchange data center.

References

Submarine communications cables in the South Atlantic Ocean
2017 establishments in Brazil
2017 establishments in Florida